In Māori mythology, Te Uranga-o-te-rā is the fifth-lowest level of the underworld, ruled by Rohe, the wife of Māui, where "she kills all the spirits she can."

References
R.D. Craig, Dictionary of Polynesian Mythology (Greenwood Press: New York, 1989), 314–5
E.R. Tregear, Maori-Polynesian Comparative Dictionary, (Lyon and Blair: Lambton Quay, 1891), 421, 578.

Notes 

Māori underworld